is a song by Japanese rock band Godiego, serving as their 7th single. Referring to the historical Buddhist land on the Indian subcontinent, "Gandhara" was used as the ending theme song for the first season of the television drama , known in the English speaking world as Monkey. "Gandhara" was originally released in Japan on October 1, 1978, but it was later released in the United Kingdom in 1980 to coincide with the British broadcast of Monkey. "Gandhara" reached number 2 on both the Oricon and The Best Ten charts in Japan, while the British release reached 56 on the UK Singles Chart.

Godiego recorded the song in both Japanese and English, with a hybrid Japanese & English version being included on the releases in the UK. The entirely English version appears on the album Magic Monkey in Japan.

Track listing
Japanese release

British release
"Gandhara"
"The Birth of the Odyssey ~ Monkey Magic"

Cover versions
 Monkey Majik covered "Gandhara" as one of the tracks on their single "MONKEY MAJIK×MONKEY MAGIC".
 Mone Kamishiraishi covered the song on her 2021 cover album Ano Uta.

External links 
  – English version
  – Japanese version

1978 singles
Godiego songs
Japanese television drama theme songs
Songs written by Yukihide Takekawa
Songs written by Yoko Narahashi
1978 songs
Utopian fiction